Akadêmia is a French early music ensemble founded in 1986 by conductor Françoise Lasserre. The initial group of singers were formed from members of Philippe Herreweghe's Chapelle Royale.

The ensemble are frequent artists at France's major early music festivals such as the Ambronay Festival. 
Several of the group's recordings have been made in cooperation with La Fenice directed Jean Tubéry.

Discography
 J. S. Bach: Cantatas BWV 12, 78, 150, Motet BWV 118, Zig-Zag Territoires. 2009
 J. S. Bach: Motets Pierre Verany
 Pier Francesco Cavalli: Vespro della beata Vergine
 Cavalli: Requiem
 Stefano Landi: La morte d'Orfeo
 Monteverdi: Selva morale
 Monteverdi: Vespro per la Salute 1650
 Monteverdi: Combattimento
 Heinrich Schütz: Musikalische Exequien
 Heinrich Schütz: Die Sieben Worte Jesu am Kreuz
 Heinrich Schütz: Matthew Passion
 Heinrich Schütz: Resurrection Oratorio
 Heinrich Schütz: Christmas story
 Palestrina: Bella vergine - cycle of Petrarca madrigals
 Palestrina: Canticum canticorum - cycle of 29 motets

References

External links
 Homepage

Early music groups